Tanya Hunks (born August 24, 1980) is a former competitive swimmer from Canada.  Hunks won bronze medals in the 10-kilometre open water swimming events at the 2006 Pan Pacific Swimming Championships and 2007 Pan American Games.  She swam in the 400-metre and 800-metre freestyle events, in addition to the 400-metre individual medley at the 2008 Summer Olympics in Beijing.

References

1980 births
Living people
Canadian female freestyle swimmers
Canadian female medley swimmers
Canadian female long-distance swimmers
Olympic swimmers of Canada
Sportspeople from Brantford
Swimmers at the 2007 Pan American Games
Swimmers at the 2008 Summer Olympics
UBC Thunderbirds swimmers
Pan American Games bronze medalists for Canada
Pan American Games medalists in swimming
Medalists at the 2007 Pan American Games
21st-century Canadian women